Mahmoud Omidsalar (born November 26, 1950) is an Iranian literary critic and Jordan Center for Persian Studies' Scholar in Residence. He is known for his research on Persian epic and Shahnameh in particular.
He is an editor of the Encyclopaedia Iranica and an author of The Comprehensive History of Iran.
He has criticized Eurocentrism and Orientalism in his works.

References

Living people
Iranian literary critics
University of California, Berkeley alumni
1950 births